Oreste Rizzini (March 27, 1940 – March 18, 2008) was an Italian actor and voice actor.

Biography
Born in Milan, Rizzini began his career working as an actor on stage at some point during the early 1960s. He also narrated the documentary film Succede in Quarantotto or Italy After the War released in 1994.

As a voice actor, Rizzini was best known for working on various American films' Italian language versions. He was most well known for dubbing the voice of Michael Douglas in many of his films. He was also well known for providing the Italian voices of Bill Murray, Jon Voight, Gene Hackman, Dustin Hoffman and Christopher Walken in some of their films. In his animated roles, he voiced Lord Farquaad in the Italian dub of Shrek as well as Skeletor in He-Man and the Masters of the Universe.

Death
Rizzini died of stomach cancer in Rome on March 18, 2008, nine days before his 68th birthday. He was later interred in a cemetery in Capalbio.

Dubbing roles

Animation
Lord Farquaad in Shrek
Lord Farquaad in Shrek 4-D
Lord Farquaad in Shrek the Third
Seti I in The Prince of Egypt
Narrator in Hercules
Skeletor in He-Man and the Masters of the Universe (3rd voice)
Jean-Claude in Rugrats in Paris: The Movie
The Falcon in Stuart Little 2
Lord Qin in Mulan II
Scooter / Joe Snow in It's a Very Merry Muppet Christmas Movie
Peter Venkman in The Real Ghostbusters

Live action
Nathan R. Conrad in Don't Say a Word
Jack Colton in Romancing the Stone
Jack Colton in The Jewel of the Nile
Zach in A Chorus Line
Oliver Rose in The War of the Roses
Ed Leland in Shining Through
Nick Curran in Basic Instinct
Charles Remington in The Ghost and the Darkness
Nicholas van Orton in The Game
Robert Wakefield in Traffic
Mr. Burmeister in One Night at McCool's
Steve Tobias in The In-Laws
Alex Gromberg in It Runs in the Family
Pete Garrison in The Sentinel
Bob Thompson in You, Me and Dupree
Peter Venkman in Ghostbusters
Peter Venkman in Ghostbusters II
Mick Dundee in Crocodile Dundee
Mick Dundee in Crocodile Dundee II
Oscar "Manny" Manheim in Runaway Train
Leo F. Drummond in The Rainmaker
Thomas Brian Reynolds in Enemy of the State
John McClane in Die Hard 2
Denethor in The Lord of the Rings: The Two Towers
Denethor in The Lord of the Rings: The Return of the King
Alex Gates in Blood and Wine
William Cleary in Wedding Crashers
William Earle in Batman Begins
James Braddock in Missing in Action 2: The Beginning
James Braddock in Braddock: Missing in Action III
Bud Newman in The Santa Clause 3: The Escape Clause
Isador "Machete" Cortez in Spy Kids
Isador "Machete" Cortez in Spy Kids 2: The Island of Lost Dreams
Lando Calrissian in Star Wars: Episode VI – Return of the Jedi
Tion Medon in Star Wars: Episode III – Revenge of the Sith
Kreacher in Harry Potter and the Order of the Phoenix
Bob Harris in Lost in Translation
Don Johnston in Broken Flowers
Elmer C. Robinson in Lonely Hearts

References

External links

1940 births
2008 deaths
Male actors from Milan
Italian male stage actors
Italian male voice actors
Deaths from stomach cancer
Deaths from cancer in Lazio
20th-century Italian male actors
21st-century Italian male actors
Italian voice directors